Jaime Quesada Chavarría (born 21 September 1971) is a Spanish retired footballer who played as a right-back.

Club career
Quesada was born in Barcelona, Catalonia. During his career, he represented CE L'Hospitalet, UE Lleida, Real Betis (signing in the summer of 1994 he lived his most successful period there, notably featuring in 34 games in his first year as the Andalusians finished third straight out of the Segunda División), UD Las Palmas, Recreativo de Huelva and Cultural y Deportiva Leonesa.

Quesada totalled 155 matches in La Liga and scored two goals, both for Lleida in the 1993–94 season. He retired in 2003 due to a serious fibula injury, and later returned to Betis as a youth coach.

References

External links

Betisweb stats and bio 

1971 births
Living people
Spanish footballers
Footballers from Barcelona
Association football defenders
La Liga players
Segunda División players
Segunda División B players
CE L'Hospitalet players
UE Lleida players
Real Betis players
UD Las Palmas players
Recreativo de Huelva players
Cultural Leonesa footballers
Catalonia international footballers